Devaraj–Mohan was a directing duo of the Indian film industry, mainly of Tamil-language films. They were known for quality films made on a low budget, thus giving a very reasonable profit for almost every film. The duo is also notable for launching one of the most prolific Indian composers, Ilaiyaraaja through their film Annakili.

Actor Sivakumar played the lead in most of their films. After 1980, the duo split and S. Devarajan directed some films. Mohan died in January 2012 due to a head injury.

Filmography

References

External links

20th-century Indian film directors
Tamil film directors
Indian filmmaking duos